Shipitsyna is a rural locality (a village) in Yorgvinskoye Rural Settlement, Kudymkarsky District, Perm Krai, Russia. The population was 44 as of 2010.

Geography 
Shipitsyna is located 19 km north of Kudymkar (the district's administrative centre) by road. Antropova is the nearest rural locality.

References 

Rural localities in Kudymkarsky District